Namatius (died 558/60) was the rector of Provence under the Merovingians and later bishop of Vienne from c. 552 until his death in office. He is probably identical to the person with the same name recorded among the attendants at the Council of Orange in 529.

Namatius' wife, Euphrasia, became a nun after his death. She was noted for her generosity to the poor.

Notes

Sources

550s deaths
Governors of Provence
Bishops of Vienne
Year of birth unknown
Canonizations by Pope Pius X